Qaleh Sefid-e Olya may refer to:
 Qaleh Sefid-e Olya, Kermanshah
 Qaleh Sefid-e Olya, Khuzestan